The 492d Attack Squadron is an active United States Air Force unit.  It is assigned to the 49th Operations Group, stationed at March Air Reserve Base, California.  It was reactivated on 15 April 2019.

The squadron's first predecessor was organized in 1917 as the 80th Aero Squadron.  It moved to France the following year, where it was redesignated the 492d Aero Squadron (Construction) and served as a support unit.  It returned to the United States, where it was demobilized in 1919.

The second predecessor of the squadron is the 492d Bombardment Squadron, which served in the Organized Reserve from 1925 to 1937.  It was consolidated with the Aero Squadron in 1936, but was disbanded along with other reserve units in May 1942, shortly after the United States entered World War II.

The squadron's third predecessor was activated in India in late 1942 as the 492d Bombardment Squadron.  It served in combay in the China Burma India Theater, earning a Distinguished Unit Citation.  After V-J Day, the squadron returned to the United States and was inactivated at the port of embarkation.  A few months later, the squadron was reactivated as a Strategic Air Command bomber unit.  It served in the strategic bomber role until being inactivated in 1963, when its resources were transferred to another squadron.

History

World War I
The first predecessor of the squadron is the 80th Aero Squadron which was organized at Kelly Field, San Antonio, Texas, on 15 August 1917. Early the next month the service nature of the unit became clearly apparent when it was redesignated the 80th Aero Squadron (Construction).

The squadron left Kelly Field on 28 October 1917, arriving at the Aviation Concentration Center, Garden City, Long Island on 3 November. While at Garden City, the squadron was given intensive drill and training for service overseas. The ship left port later that day, arriving at Halifax, Nova Scotia on 25 November. It waited in Halifax for other ships to form a convoy for the Atlantic crossing, and arrived at Liverpool, England on 8 December. From there, the squadron took a troop train south to a rest camp at Winchester. With the exception of 30 men who were quarantined with sickness, the squadron left Winchester on 13 December and crossed the English Channel on the SS Mona's Queen, landing at Le Havre, France, on 14 December 1917.

After arriving in France the 80th Squadron took station at the Second Aviation Instruction Center at Tours Aerodrome. There it performed construction tasks  until the end of World War I.  Meanwhile, on 1 February 1918, it had been redesignated the 492d Aero Squadron (Construction). The unit returned to the United States aboard the USS Frederick late in January 1919 and was disbanded at Garden City on 13 February.

Inter-War years
The 492d Bombardment Squadron was constituted in the Organized Reserve on 31 March 1924, and assigned to the 349th Bombardment Group as part of the General Headquarters Reserve) and allotted to the Ninth Corps Area. Training began for reserve personnel in January 1925 at Sand Point Airport, Seattle, Washington.

The unit was consolidated on 5 December 1936 with the 492d Aero Squadron, in order to perpetuate the history and traditions of the World War I organization.  The consolidation of the two units under the bombardment designation thus served to extend the history of the reserve squadron back to 15 August 1917.

The unit conducted summer training at various locations including Rockwell Field, California, and Pearson Field, Washington. It was nactivated on 2 March 1937 at Seattle by relief of personnel.  It was disbanded on 31 May 1942.

World War II
Constituted as the active duty 492d Bombardment Squadron, 7th Bombardment Group, in 1942. The squadron was activated as a Consolidated B-24 Liberator heavy bombardment squadron in the China-Burma-India Theater under Tenth Air Force at Karachi Airport, India.  The squadron immediately began preparations to enter combat. Personnel strength grew slowly at first. Yet by 1 February 1943, with 48 officers and 388 enlisted men, the squadron was considered a complete fighting unit. By that time it was equipped with eight B-24 Liberator aircraft, a number which ultimately grew to fourteen.

The squadron actually entered combat on 24 January 1943 when, operating from its base at Gaya Airfield, India, it bombed docks, shipping, and warehouses at Rangoon, Burma. That raid was followed early in February with an attack upon a railroad bridge at Myitnge. During the next five months the squadron participated in repeated attacks on enemy communications lines In central and southern Burma, particularly in the area around Rangoon.   The monsoon season, commencing in May 1943, slowed down combat operations.  In July 1943, however, the unit attacked enemy shipping in the far distant Port Blair in the Andaman Islands. During August it persistently harassed shipping lanes in the Gulf of Martaban from Rangoon down to the Andaman Islands. A significant mission for September was an attack upon the Syriam oil refineries on the river opposite Rangoon.

On 22 January 1944 the 492d Squadron took station at Madhaiganj Air Base, India. It began the second year of combat activities with continued efforts to destroy enemy-held communications into and within Burma by bombing bridges, docks and warehouses, locomotives and rolling stock, and railway marshalling yards on land, and cargo vessels and naval craft on the adjacent waters.  In mid-June 1944, after the beginning of the monsoon period, the squadron moved to Tezganon-Kurmitola, India, and for the time being ceased combat operations. Instead it began transporting gasoline across the Hump to the Fourteenth Air Force in China. The first cargo was flown to Kunming on 20 June. These operations continued until after the first of October.

For the greater part of December 1944, the squadron switched concentrated on destroying enemy stores. In December also a small component of the 492d Squadron left on six weeks of detached service in China. Based at Luliang Air Base, it engaged in hauling gasoline and other supplies to Suichwan Airfield and Liang-shan.

Early in 1945 the 492d Bombardment Squadron supported British ground forces in the region north of Mandalay and east of the Irrawaddy River.   After the fall of Rangoon on 7 May 1945 the 492d Bombardment Squadron moved to Tezpur Airfield, India, and once again took on the mission of airlifting gasoline over the Hump into China. Some six weeks were required to refit the heavy bombers as substitute cargo carriers. The first mission was flown on 20 June. The aircrews completed the allotted task by 18 September.

Six weeks later the squadron moved to Dudhkundi Airfield, India, and then to Kanchrapara on 19 November. The unit was inactivated at Camp Kilmer the following day.

Strategic Air Command

B-29 Superfortress operations
On 1 October 1946 the 492d was redesignated a very heavy bombardment unit, activated at Fort Worth Army Air Field, Texas and assigned to the 7th Bombardment Group, of Strategic Air Command. It was not until the last week in October, however, that the squadron received its first contingent of troops, 59 officers and 328 enlisted men on assignment from the 327th Bombardment Squadron.  It then began a training program which was designed primarily for overseas operations. The squadron was equipped with the Boeing B-29 Superfortress aircraft until late in the summer of 1948.

In April 1947 the 492d Squadron engaged in three long-range missions. The first was as part of a mass formation flight from its home base to Los Angeles. Next it participated in a simulated bombing attack on Kansas City. Lastly, the squadron helped to provide an escort for President Miguel Alemán Valdés of Mexico in a flight from New Orleans to Washington, D.C., in May 1947.

The squadron spent a part of June and July 1947 on maneuvers in Japan. During August most of its B-29's joined others of its companion units (9th and 436th Bombardment Squadrons) on a nonstop flight to Anchorage, Alaska, to test the immediate mobility of the 7th Bombardment Group. Before returning to Fort Worth they engaged in flights that provided training in local approach procedures and in navigation. The following month the three squadrons deployed to Giebelstadt Air Base, Germany. While in Europe they flew several training missions in the central and southern parts of the continent.

B-36 Peacemaker operations
The squadron received its first Convair B-36 Peacemaker aircraft in June 1948. A few weeks thereafter it was redesignated a heavy bombardment unit. By January 1949 the squadron had completed the transition to the new bomber and had closed out its B-29 program. In March 1949 an aircrew assigned to the unit flew nonstop a distance of 9,600 miles (from Fort Worth to Minneapolis, Great Falls, Montana Key West, Denver, Great Falls, Spokane, Denver, and back to Fort Worth) in 44 hours. As reported, this was the longest recorded flight to that date in a B-36 bomber.

In August 1949 the 492d Squadron inaugurated for the 7th Bombardment Group a series of routine training missions to Alaska. During February 1950 the squadron participated with other bombardment units of the group in an operational readiness test which also involved flights to Alaska. For that purpose they deployed several
aircraft to Eielson Air Force Base. It served as a forward staging area from which simulated missions were directed against designated targets in the United States. In Hay 1950 the 492d Squadron provided one of two B-36'8 on a mobility mission to Ramey Air Force Base, Puerto Rico.

On 17 July 1951 six aircraft and aircrews assigned to the squadron departed Fort Worth for Goose Air Base, Labrador, Canada. Thence they were dispatched on a navigation mission to Thule Air Base, Greenland.  On the return flight from Goose Bay to Carswell, they made simulated attacks on Tampa, Florida; Birmingham, Alabama; and Fort Worth. Another deployment to Goose Bay on a unit simulated combat mission followed in March 1954. Meanwhile, in December 1951 the squadron provided one of two heavy bombers of the 7th Bombardment Wing on a special mission to RAF Sculthorpe, England. The purpose of this deployment was to participate in a Royal Air Force navigation mission on a noncompetitive basis, to effect a mutual exchange of ideas with Royal Air Force personnel, and to compare techniques in target study and briefing.

In August 1954 the 492d Squadron participated in a 7th Bombardment Wing maneuver to North Africa on a simulated strike mission, flying non-stop the 4,600 miles to Nouasseur Air Base, French Morocco, which had been designated the post-strike headquarters.

B-52 Stratofortress operations
In December 1957 the entire 7th Bombardment wing began preparations for converting from the B-36 aircraft to the Boeing B-52F Stratofortress. Early in February, the wing officially became a B-52 organization. In January 1959 the wing attained a combat ready status in the B-52.

On 15 June 1959, less than six months after having completed the transition from the B-36 to the B-52 aircraft, the 492d Bombardment Squadron was reassigned to SAC's 4228th Strategic Wing and moved to Columbus Air Force Base, Mississippi to disperse SAC's heavy bomber force.  It conducted worldwide strategic bombardment training missions and providing nuclear deterrent.

It was inactivated in 1963 when SAC inactivated its MAJCON Strategic Wings, replacing them with permanent AFCON Wings.  The squadron's aircraft, personnel and equipment were transferred to the 736th Bombardment Squadron, which was simultaneously activated.

Unmanned vehicle training
The squadron was redesignated the 492d Attack Squadron and activated at March Air Reserve Base, California to train operators of unmanned aerial vehicles.

Lineage
 492d Aero Squadron
 Organized as the 80th Aero Squadron (Construction) on 15 August 1917
 Redesignated 492d Aero Squadron (Construction) on 1 February 1918
 Demobilized on 13 February 1919
 Reconstituted and consolidated with the 492d Bombardment Squadron on 5 December 1936

 492d Bombardment Squadron
 Constituted as the 492d Bombardment Squadron and allotted to the Organized Reserve on 31 March 1924
 "Initiated" in January 1925
 Consolidated with the 492d Aero Squadron on 5 December 1936
 Inactivated on 2 March 1937
 Disbanded on 31 May 1942
 Consolidated with the 492d Bombardment Squadron, Heavy on 31 March 1960

 492d Attack Squadron
 Constituted as the 492d Bombardment Squadron (Heavy) on 19 September 1942
 Activated on 25 October 1942
 Redesignated 492d Bombardment Squadron, Heavy c. 19 September 1944
 Inactivated on 6 January 1946
 Redesignated 492d Bombardment Squadron, Very Heavy and activated, on 1 October 1946
 Redesignated 492d Bombardment Squadron, Heavy on 20 July 1948
 Consolidated with the 492d Bombardment Squadron on 31 March 1960
 Discontinued and inactivated on 1 February 1963
 Redesignated 492d Attack Squadron on 26 Mar 2019
 Activated on 15 Apr 2019

Assignments
 Post Headquarters, Kelly Field, Texas, 15 August-28 October 1917
 Aviation Concentration Center, 3–22 November 1917
 Second Aviation Instruction Center, 15 January 1918 – 9 December 1918  
 Air Service, Service of Supply, 9 December 1918 – 13 February 1919
 349th Bombardment Group, 1925 – 2 Mar 1937
 7th Bombardment Group, 25 October 1942 – 6 January 1946; 1 October 1946
 7th Bombardment Wing, 16 June 1952
 4228th Strategic Wing, 15 June 1959 – 1 February 1963
 49th Operations Group, 15 April 2019 – present

Stations

 Kelly Field, Texas, 15 August 1917
 Aviation Concentration Center, Garden City, New York, 3–22 November 1917
 Tours Aerodrome, France, 15 January 1918
 Brest, France, c. 9 December 1918-c. 19 January 1919
 Sand Point Airport, Washington, January 1925 – 2 March 1937
 Garden City, New York, c. 31 January–13 February 1919
 Karachi Airport, India, 25 October 1942
 Gaya Airfield, India, 14 November 1942
 Piardoba Airfield, India, 26 February 1943
 Panagarh Airfield, India, 25 April 1943

 Madhaiganj Air Base, India, 22 January 1944
 Tezgaon Airdrome, India, 17 June 1944
 Madhaiganj Air Base, India, 6 October 1944
 Detachment at Liulang Air Base, China, 20 December 1944 – 30 January 1945
 Tezpur Airfield, India, 1 June–7 December 1945
 Camp Kilmer, New Jersey, 5–6 January 1946
 Fort Worth Army Air Field (later Carswell Air Force Base), Texas, 1 October 1946
 Columbus Air Force Base, Mississippi, 15 June 1959 – 1 February 1963
 March Air Reserve Base, California, 15 April 2019 – present

Aircraft
 Consolidated B-24 Liberator, 1942–1945
 Boeing B-29 Superfortress, 1946–1948
 Convair B-36 Peacemaker, 1948–1958
 Boeing B-52F Stratofortress, 1958-1963
 General Atomics MQ-9 Reaper, 2019–present

See also

 List of B-52 Units of the United States Air Force

References

Notes
 Explanatory notes

 Citations

Bibliography

 
 
 
 
 

Military units and formations in California
Attack squadrons of the United States Air Force